The 2009 Big East men's basketball tournament, a part of the 2008–09 NCAA Division I men's basketball season, took place in March 2009 at Madison Square Garden in New York City.  The Louisville Cardinals defeated the Syracuse Orange 76–66 in the tournament finals to earn the Big East tournament championship for the first time, and received the Big East Conference's automatic bid to the 2009 NCAA tournament.

This was the first Big East tournament to include all 16 of the conference's teams. The teams finishing 9 through 16 in the regular season standings played first-round games, while teams 5 through 8 received byes to the second round. The top 4 teams during the regular season received double-byes to the quarterfinals. The tournament featured a conference record six-overtime quarterfinals game (the second longest game in NCAA history) in which Syracuse defeated UConn 127–117.

Announcers

Television

Local Radio

Bracket
All times Eastern. Rankings from AP Poll.

Results

First round

Second round

Quarterfinals

Syracuse vs. Connecticut

The quarterfinal game on Thursday, March 12 between Syracuse and Connecticut lasted for six overtime periods, the second-longest game in NCAA Division I Men's Basketball history. The record is a seven overtime game from December 21, 1981, in which Cincinnati outlasted Bradley 75–73, in a game that took place before the implementation of the shot clock. Syracuse beat Connecticut 127–117 without having the lead in any of the first five overtimes. The game tipped off at 9:36 PM ET and ended at 1:22 AM ET on Friday March 13; in the 3 hours and 46 minutes it took to play the game, a combined total of 244 points were scored (102 of which were scored in overtime), 211 field-goals attempted (103 in overtime), 93 free throws attempted, 66 fouls committed with four players on each team fouling out.

Semifinals

Championship game

See also
 2009 Big East women's basketball tournament

References 

Tournament
Big East men's basketball tournament
Basketball competitions in New York City
College sports in New York City
Sports in Manhattan
Big East men's basketball tournament
Big East men's basketball tournament
2000s in Manhattan
Madison Square Garden